Marko Ilić (born 9 May 1985) is a Serbian footballer.

References
 Profile and stats from Serbia at Srbijafudbal

1985 births
Living people
Footballers from Belgrade
Serbian footballers
Serbian expatriate footballers
Association football midfielders
OFK Beograd players
FK Metalac Gornji Milanovac players
FK Bežanija players
Serbian SuperLiga players
PFC Lokomotiv Plovdiv players
PFC Spartak Varna players
PFC Beroe Stara Zagora players
OFC Sliven 2000 players
First Professional Football League (Bulgaria) players
Expatriate footballers in Bulgaria
FK Srem players